Tethys fimbria is a species of predatory sea slug, a nudibranch, a marine gastropod mollusk in the family Tethydidae.

ICZN opinion 200 ruled that Tethys fimbria is a valid name and Tethys leporina Linnaeus, 1758 is a synonym.

Distribution 
The distribution of Tethys fimbria includes the Mediterranean Sea and the east coast of the Atlantic Ocean from Portugal in the north, to the Gulf of Guinea in the south.

Description 
Tethys fimbria is translucent, but it has dark spots on its cerata. It has a broad oral hood in the frontal part of its body. Rhinophores are small. Tethys fimbria has no radula as is the case in all members of the family Tethydidae.

Ecology 

The habitat of Tethys fimbria is seas which have sand or mud on the bottom, in depths from 20 to 150 m.

Tethys fimbria captures and feeds on small crustaceans. It uses its broad hood for catching them.

The cerata can be self-amputated (autotomy) as a defence mechanism when the slug is in danger.

Within the mantle large amounts of prostaglandins are produced. Subsequently the prostoglandins are moved to the cerata. The biosynthesis of prostgandins has been studied by Marzo et al. (1991).

References

Further reading 
 Cattaneo-Vietti R., Chemello R., Giannuzzi-Savelli R. (1990). Atlas of Mediterranean Nudibranchs. La Conchiglia, Rome. 264 pp.
 
 Odhner N. H. (1936). "Nudibranchia Dendronotacea - A revision of the system". Memoires du Musee Royal d'Histoire Naturelle de Belgique, series 2, fasc. 3: 1057-1128. (Pl. 1)
  Schmekel L. & Portmann A. (1982). Opisthobranchia des Mittelmeeres. Nudibranchia und Saccoglossa. Springer-Verlag, Berlin. 410 pp., 36 plates.

External links 

Tethydidae